Malankara may refer to:

 Malankara Church, a collection of Indian apostolic churches
 Malankara Orthodox Syrian Church, an Oriental Orthodox denomination in India
 Syro-Malankara Catholic Church, an Eastern Catholic denomination in India
 Malankara Metropolitan, a legal title given to the head of the Malankara Church Puthenkoor Christians
 Malankara Rite, a version of the West Syriac liturgical rite 
 Malankara–Persia relations, relations between Christians of Malankara and Persia 
 Malankara Catholic College, Mariagiri, Tamil Nadu, India

See also
 Malabar (disambiguation)